The Soul2Soul II Tour was the second co-headlining concert tour between American country music singers, and husband and wife, Tim McGraw and Faith Hill.  Beginning as the Soul2Soul II Tour 2006, its shows featured elaborate production values using an open, cross-shaped stage. Performances consisted of a set by Hill and set by McGraw, with the two sharing duets before, during, and after the individual sets.  Over the course of the show, the duets traced a thematic development starting at estrangement and ending in emotional closeness.

The tour capitalized on McGraw and Hill's popularity, both as musical artists and as a couple. It played 74 shows in 56 cities, and sold 1.1 million tickets.
The tour grossed almost $89 million during 2006.  For the year, it was the third-highest grossing tour in North America (behind The Rolling Stones' A Bigger Bang Tour and Barbra Streisand's Streisand: The Tour); and the fifth-highest grossing tour in the world for 2006.

Soul2Soul II Tour 2006 became the highest-grossing country music tour of all time, a position it still holds as of December 2007.  For its accomplishments, it received  Pollstar's top Concert Industry Award, the  Major Tour of the Year Award, for 2006.

The tour was then continued the following year, as the rebranded Soul2Soul 2007.  Some new songs were added to the set list, but the overall structure and theme of the show remained.  Soul2Soul 2007 grossed some $52 million. Together, the McGraw-Hill Soul2Soul tour has the highest gross for any multi-year country music tour ever, $141 million, breaking a mark previously held by Garth Brooks.  Over 1.6 million people saw the show over its two years. The tour was the highest grossing tour ever by a country artist until Taylor Swift's "The Red Tour" surpassed it in 2014.

History

2006 tour

The tour's name was a reprise of the couple's very successful 2000 Soul2Soul Tour. It capitalized on the couple's popularity as a couple: The New York Times wrote that, "Faith Hill and Tim McGraw may be the most popular married couple in country music, and maybe in all of pop music."  The pair had three albums on the country charts at the time, Hill's Fireflies and McGraw's Live Like You Were Dying and Reflected: Greatest Hits Vol. 2.

Hill and McGraw first announced the Soul2Soul II Tour on January 30, 2006. It quickly became one of the fastest-selling concert events of the year, with additional shows added in 15 cities due to high ticket demand; Ticketmaster labelled it the fastest-selling show of the year.  Ticket sales passed the one million mark with the one-millionth fan attending the first of three shows in Los Angeles at the Staples Center. The lucky fan was given a Dodge Charger as a thank you gift from the couple.

The tour began on April 21, 2006 at the Nationwide Arena in Columbus, Ohio, and after 73 shows concluded on September 3, 2006 at the Mandalay Bay Resort and Casino in Paradise, Nevada.

On May 11, Hill and McGraw announced that the July 5 concert in New Orleans would benefit Gulf Coast hurricane relief efforts.  From the beginning, Hill and McGraw have expressed criticism of the government response to Hurricane Katrina and the other Gulf Coast hurricanes. Hill is a native of Mississippi and McGraw is a native of Louisiana. All of the net proceeds of the concert were targeted to Katrina relief efforts in those two states.  Tickets for the concert went on sale several days later and within 30 minutes, the 17,000 available seats had sold out.  McGraw also played one of his informal "Bread and Water" shows, staged at local clubs after an arena show, with proceeds going to hurricane relief efforts as well.

2007 tour

On February 4, 2007, it was announced that the couple would return to the road in the summer of 2007 with Soul2Soul 2007 due to the success of Soul2Soul II.  They aimed to visit U.S. and Canadian cities they could not reach in 2006; the restart a year later was to still mainstain a mostly-summertime schedule, to accommodate their school-age children.  On March 14, 2007, Tim McGraw announced on an appearance on Good Morning America that the Soul2Soul 2007 Tour would probably be the last time he and Hill would tour together.  On March 16, 2007, the same day tickets went on sale for the performances in Canada, both of the singers' websites announced that additional shows had been added in select Canadian cities due to overwhelming ticket sales and it had been announced that the June 21 show in Saskatoon and the June 22 show in Winnipeg were record breaking sales.
The 2007 tour established a new record gross during both its two-day stop in Omaha and single day in St. Paul, Minnesota for a single country show.

In 2007, McGraw and Hill played forty-three shows over a nine-week period, with the Jeep brand as the title sponsor.  The tour featured the duo's first-ever performances throughout Canada.  The routing also includes shows in Lafayette, Louisiana and Biloxi, Mississippi, that were specifically requested by McGraw and Hill as being close to where they grew up.

At the July 28 show in Lafayette, Louisiana, at the close of Tim McGraw's set, a female fan reached out and grabbed McGraw's nether regions. When Hill and McGraw returned for the encore, during their performance of "It's Only Love", Hill blasted the fan, waving her finger and saying into the microphone: "Somebody needs to teach you some class, my friend! You don't go grabbin' somebody else's, somebody's husband's [privates], you understand me?! That's very disrespectful!"  The incident attracted considerable media attention, and Hill subsequently went on The Ellen DeGeneres Show to discuss it.

The stage and the show
The tour featured production values and cost usually associated with large-scale rock tours.  A multimillion-dollar, unique in-the-round stage set was used. A circular platform in the center of the arena floor was surrounded by a larger circle beneath it, where the band played; vertical scrims could fall down to enclose this area.  Performers could disappear or arise through hidden platforms.  Extending in all four directions from the circles were long, wide catwalks with mass-motion video screens embedded within them, with fans seated on both sides and at the ends of the catwalks.  Moving the whole 130,000 pound production from city to city took 150 roadies, 22 trucks, and 14 buses.

The show, which lasted from two and a half to two and three-quarters hours, was structured as a set by Faith Hill, followed by a set by Tim McGraw; in general audiences responded more strongly to McGraw's performance, hence Hill was placed in the opening spot.  Before, in between, and after the individual sets, the two performed together.  Throughout, Hill and McGraw used body language to convey the themes of the show; The New York Times wrote that "both singers have an extraordinary knack for making big gestures seem human-size."

The lyrical themes and the physical staging of the duet songs followed a connected thread throughout the course of the show, starting at one end of the emotional spectrum and ending at the other.  The opening duet, the bitter "Like We Never Loved At All", was sung by the two at completely opposite ends of the stage, facing away from each other.  For the next duets, after Hill's set, they were near each other, but enclosing in a scrim and still not facing each other, as they sang "Angry All the Time" and "Let's Make Love".  In the final group of duets, following McGraw's set, the two began to thematically reconcile, including a rendition of Bob Marley's "No Woman, No Cry".  In the last song of the night, the two sat knee-to-knee opposite each other, around an old-radio-style microphone, for a hushed performance of "I Need You".

Hill's performance emphasized her varied country, pop, and gospel flavorings, with arrangements that showcased her vocal control over her lower register. McGraw's performance was more oriented towards traditional country, and evinces a stronger stage presence, with his "Live Like You Were Dying" typically getting the biggest audience response. Hill's band played from the start of the show through the second joint appearance, after which McGraw's Dancehall Doctors backing outfit took over for the balance of the show.

The concerts even featured hints of a rock element, from a few of McGraw's arrangements to Hill's guitarist's U2 textures to the Who-like introductory music to the presence of KISS and Blue Öyster Cult in the pre-show music.

In the 2007 shows, the general approach and themes were similar, but a number of set list changes were made.  The couple started the shows with a rendition of Snow Patrol's "Chasing Cars".  New songs in Faith Hill's set included "Wild One", "The Secret of Life", and "Lost".  McGraw's set included material that he had not performed in years, including "Indian Outlaw", "Everywhere", and "She's My Kind of Rain". He did omit "Don't Take the Girl", a long-time standby. The 2007 tour saw the addition of opening acts; with their 30-minute performances, the overall evening ran three hours or longer.

Opening acts
No opening acts were used on the 2006 tour.

For the 2007 tour, the opening acts were:
Lori McKenna (select venues)
Taylor Swift (select venues)
Lance Miller (select venues)
Halfway to Hazard (select venues)

Set list

2006
Hill/McGraw
"Like We Never Loved At All"
Hill
"Mississippi Girl" 
"The Way You Love Me" 
"Sunshine and Summertime' 
"Fireflies" 
"This Kiss" 
"Let Me Let Go" 
 Let's Make Love 
"Stealing Kisses" 1
" Bridge Over Troubled Water" 1 
"The Lucky One" 
" Cry" 
"There Will Come a Day" 
"Breathe" 
Hill/McGraw
"Angry All the Time"
McGraw
"Real Good Man" 
"Where the Green Grass Grows"
"Just to See You Smile"
" Don't Take the Girl"
"My Little Girl"
"Something Like That"
"When the Stars Go Blue" 
"Live Like You Were Dying"
"Unbroken"
"The Cowboy in Me"
"I've Got Friends That Do" 1
"Last Dollar (Fly Away)" 1
"I Like It, I Love It" 1
Hill/McGraw
"Shotgun Rider"
"It's Your Love"
"No Woman, No Cry" 
Encore: 
"I Need You"

1 Performed at select dates

Source:

2007
Hill/McGraw
"Chasing Cars" 
Hill
"Wild One
"The Lucky One"
"The Secret of Life"
"Cry"
" Sunshine and Summertime"
"This Kiss"
"Stronger"
"Lost"
" Red Umbrella"
" The Way You Love Me"
"The Winner Takes It All
"Breathe
"Piece of My Heart" 
"Mississippi Girl"
Hill/McGraw
"Angry All the Time"
"Like We Never Loved At All"
McGraw
"The Joker" 
"Last Dollar (Fly Away)"
"Something Like That"
"When the Stars Go Blue"
"Everywhere"
"For a Little While"
"She's My Kind of Rain"
"Live Like You Were Dying"
"Suspicions" 
"Real Good Man" 1
"The Ride" 1
"The Cowboy in Me"
"Between the River and Me"
"Indian Outlaw"
"If You're Reading This"
Hill/McGraw
"Shotgun Rider"
 "Let's Make Love"
"It's Only Love"
Encore:
"I Need You"

1 Performed at select dates

Additional notes
At the June 23 New York City concert at Madison Square Garden, Tony Bennett made a  surprise guest appearance, and duetted with McGraw on the Hank Williams classic "Cold, Cold Heart".
At the final concert of the tour, McGraw added some new material from some of his favorite artists – Tom Petty's "Breakdown", "Mama Tried" from Merle Haggard, and "You Look So Good In Love" from George Strait.
At select dates in 2007, Hill was joined onstage by singer-songwriter Angie Aparo for a duet version of her 2002 hit "Cry." The song was written and originally recorded by Aparo for his 1999 album The American.

Tour dates

Box office score data
Soul2Soul 2007

Personnel

Hill
Guitar: Pat Buchanan, Denny Hemingson and Jerry McPherson
Bass guitar: Paul Bushnell
Acoustic guitar: Faith Hill and Bob Minner
Keyboards: Jimmy Nichols
Drums: Paul Leim
Backing vocals: Crystal Taliefero, Perry Coleman, and Wendy Moten

McGraw (The Dancehall Doctors)
Guitar: Denny Hemingson and Darran Smith
Acoustic guitar / Resonator Guitar: Bob Minner
Bass guitar: John Marcus
Keyboards: Jeff McMahon
Drums: David Dunkley and Billy Mason

See also
 List of highest grossing concert tours

References

External links
Hill's Official Website
McGraw's Official Website

2006 concert tours
2007 concert tours
Tim McGraw and Faith Hill concert tours
Co-headlining concert tours